John Joseph Wardle (born 11 August 1958), known by the stage name Jah Wobble, is an English bass guitarist and singer. He became known to a wider audience as the original bass player in Public Image Ltd (PiL) in the late 1970s and early 1980s; he left the band after two albums.

Following his departure from PiL, he developed a solo career. In 2012, he reunited with fellow PiL guitarist Keith Levene for Metal Box in Dub and the album Yin & Yang. Since 2013, he has been one of the featured pundits on Sunday morning's The Virtual Jukebox segment of BBC Radio 5 Live's Up All Night with Dotun Adebayo. His autobiography, Memoirs of a Geezer, was published in 2009.

Early life
Wardle was born in Stepney, East London, His father, Harry Eugene Wardle, worked as a postman, while his mother, Kathleen Bridget (née Fitzgibbon), was a school and County Hall secretary. Wobble grew up with his family in Whitechapel's Clichy Estate in London's East End. He is a long-time friend of John Lydon (Johnny Rotten) whom he had met in the 1970s at London's Kingsway College. The two formed half of the group of friends known as "The Four Johns", along with John Grey and John Simon Ritchie (later known as Sid Vicious). Jah Wobble acquired his stage name through the drunken, mumbled version of Wardle's name by Sid Vicious, which Wobble kept because "people would never forget it".

Musical career 
In his early life and career, by his own admission, Wardle was given to occasional bouts of aggression, exacerbated by heavy drinking and drug use. As a result, he ended up living in a squat with John Gray in West London, whilst Lydon formed The Sex Pistols. With admittedly large "builders hands", he had experimented with the guitar, but found playing bass a more connected and whole body experience, influenced in part by admiring Bob Marley's and The Wailers bassist Aston "Family Man" Barrett on stage in 1975. Wardle was as critical of his friend Vicious's bass playing as John Lydon, and had hence played in experimentation sessions with Lydon. After he burned the furniture of his squat-mates in order to stay warm, they left him alone there with a mattress, a headboard and his Music Man-copy bass.

Public Image Ltd (PiL) 
Following the Sex Pistols' break-up, Lydon approached Wobble about forming a band. Both had similarly broad musical tastes, and were avid fans of reggae and world music. The band began rehearsing together in May 1978, although remained unnamed until July 1978, when Lydon officially named the band Public Image (PiL) (the "Ltd" was not added until several months later), after the Muriel Spark novel The Public Image. Wobble's bass playing drew heavily on dub, which has remained an important feature of his music. Having experimented with Lydon pre-Sex Pistols break-up, he had written a simple repetitive bassline on which Lydon wrote "Public Image". PiL debuted in October 1978 with "Public Image", which reached number 9 on the UK charts, and also performed well on import in the US. Wobble has stated that the first PiL album was recorded so quickly due in part to the bassist's altercations with a sound engineer and men at a nearby pub. He has, however, dismissed claims accusing him of extreme malice, such as setting fire to the former drummer for The Fall, Karl Burns, while Burns was session drumming for PiL.

Wobble co-wrote and contributed bass and drums to PiL's second album Metal Box, which was released in 1979. However, he grew increasingly frustrated by the lacklustre creative atmosphere in the band, which he felt stifled his artistic ambitions and PiL's creative potential. Besides differences in artistic vision, further conflicts were brought on in part by heavy drug and alcohol abuse in the band. Wobble then recorded his debut album The Legend Lives On... Jah Wobble in "Betrayal", making unauthorised use of material from Metal Box for which he was summarily fired from PiL in late 1980.

Wobble also released at least one single during his period as a member of PiL: His 1978 single "Dreadlock Don't Deal in Wedlock" in which he recites Edward Lear's "The Owl and the Pussycat" and finishes with the immortal line, 'love and marriage is like ice cream and cabbage ... dreadlock don't deal in wedlock."

Early post-PiL years
Soon after leaving PiL, Wobble formed The Human Condition with guitarist Dave "Animal" Maltby and PiL's original drummer, Jim Walker. The Human Condition toured the UK, Europe, and US in 1981, and made two cassette-only releases of their live shows (Live at the Collegiate Theatre and Live in Europe). The post-PiL years saw Wobble also collaborating with Can members Holger Czukay and Jaki Liebezeit on Czukay's solo projects (notably On the Way to the Peak of Normal and Rome Remains Rome) and Full Circle (released in 1984).

In 1983, Wardle appeared on the LP Snake Charmer billed as a co-leader alongside guitarist The Edge of U2, Czukay, Liebezeit, and producer François Kevorkian.

Jah Wobble's Invaders of the Heart was formed in 1982. The original line-up was Ollie Marland on keys (who went on to become Tina Turner's musical director), Annie Whitehead on trombone, Neville Murray on percussion and a musician named only as Cliff, on drums. By 1983 Lee Partis was the drummer. Trumpeter Harry Beckett and pedal steel player B. J. Cole regularly performed with the group.

By 1985 Jah Wobble's heavy drinking and drunken brawls were having an effect on his life. Halfway through the recording of the album Psalms (October 1986), Wobble stopped drinking. From then through to the present day he has remained 'clean and sober'.

He then did a variety of day jobs, whilst continuing to perform and record his music in what spare time he had. These jobs included a long stretch with the London Underground. In an oft-quoted tale, it is related that he once, at Tower Hill Underground Station via the public address system, regaled commuters with the deadpan announcement, "I used to be somebody. I repeat, I used to be somebody."

By 1987, due to the repeated prompting of his friend and former bandmate, percussionist Neville Murray, Wobble reformed The Invaders of the Heart. Armed with a live recording of a concert he had made with a new line-up of musicians during a European tour in 1988, Wobble travelled to New York City's New Music Seminar in 1989 to get back into the music industry. Wobble was able to secure an eleventh-hour record deal with a small European record label. The live album, Without Judgement, recorded in the Netherlands was released in November 1989 and successfully revived Wobble's career.

Early 1990s to present
Following the success of Jah Wobble's Invaders of the Heart albums Without Judgement in 1990 and Rising Above Bedlam in 1991, Wobble has collaborated with many musicians - Brian Eno among them - & his explorations into world music predated much of the genre's popularity. Jah Wobble's 1994 album Take Me To God was influenced by world music genres and contributions from a variety of artists of diverse cultural backgrounds, including Baaba Maal, Dolores O'Riordan, and Chaka Demus, and was a critical and commercial success. His music has spanned a number of genres, including ambient music and dance music, and in 2003, reworkings of traditional English folk songs. Although he has released recordings since the late seventies Wobble has been particularly prolific from the mid-1990s to the present. He now runs his own label, 30 Hertz Records, and tours regularly throughout the UK and Europe with his current band, Jah Wobble & The Invaders of the Heart.

Wobble was part of the industrial music supergroup The Damage Manual, which formed in 2000 and consisted of Wobble on bass alongside former PiL and Killing Joke drummer Martin Atkins, Killing Joke guitarist Geordie Walker, and vocalist Chris Connelly (who had previously worked with Atkins as part of two other industrial music supergroups, Pigface and Murder Inc., the latter of which also featured Walker). He appeared on the group's self-titled debut album as well as the EP One, both of which were released on Atkins' Invisible Records label, but subsequently left the group after declining to participate in their tour of the U.S.

A collaboration with his wife, the Chinese-born guzheng player Zi Lan Liao, was entitled Chinese Dub. He also performed at the 2008 Rhythm Festival.

Jah Wobble and the Chinese Dub Orchestra won the Cross-Cultural Collaboration category, for their album Chinese Dub, in the inaugural Songlines Music Awards, announced on 1 May 2009, which were the new world music awards organised by the UK based magazine, Songlines.

In September 2009, John Lydon reformed PiL for a series of concerts in late 2009. Despite Lydon's invitation to join, Jah Wobble did not feature in the line-up, since he considered the wages offered insufficient and disagreed with the choice of venues.

At an impromptu appearance at the Musicport Festival in Bridlington Spa on 24 October 2010, where they were joined by vocalist Johnny Rotter of the Sex Pistols Experience, Wobble renewed his association with former PiL guitarist Keith Levene.

In 2011, Wobble collaborated with Julie Campbell, alias Warp Records artist LoneLady in a project called Psychic Life. The eponymous debut album Psychic Life was inspired by disco, post-punk and psychogeography, and released by Cherry Red Records on 14 November 2011. Keith Levene contributed to three tracks on the album. A digital-only EP, Psychic Life, fronted by the song "Tightrope", was released in October 2011.

In early 2012, after some planned Japan gigs were cancelled because of visa issues, Wobble and Levene played various UK clubs as Metal Box in Dub.  The visa issues were resolved and they played Fuji Rock festival in July 2012. This was followed by the release of a four-song, eponymous EP. An album entitled Yin & Yang was released in November 2012.

Wobble has also collaborated with the British ambient group Marconi Union, the results of which were released as an album called Anomic on 30 Hertz records in June 2013. In October 2013, 30 Hertz Records released Odds & Sods & Epilogues, an illustrated book/CD of Jah Wobble's poetry.

In 2015, Cherry Red Records released Redux, a six-CD box set that spans nearly four decades of Wobble's music. It includes new tracks Merry Go Round and Let's Go Psycho. In May 2015, Jah Wobble & The Invaders of the Heart embarked on an extensive six-month UK tour. They recorded the album The Usual Suspects which was released on 3m Music in 2017. A series of gigs in England from January to May 2017 was announced.

Other activities
Jah Wobble studied part-time for four years at Birkbeck, University of London, graduating in 2000 with an upper second-class honours degree in the humanities.

His autobiography, entitled Memoirs of a Geezer: Music, Life, Mayhem (Serpent's Tail books, London), was released in September 2009. It was well received by critics. He also writes occasional book reviews for The Independent.

Personal life
Wobble has four children:  including music producer Natalie Wardle from his first marriage, and two sons with his second wife, the Chinese-born guzheng player and harpist Zi Lan Liao.

List of collaborators
Jah Wobble past and present collaborators (listed alphabetically)

Discography

Post PIL singles and EPs

Jah Wobble main discography

Footnotes

References

Bibliography
Further reading:

External links 

 
 
 
 Jah Wobble statistics, tagging and previews at Last.FM
 Jah Wobble's Invaders of the Heart statistics, tagging and previews at Last.FM
 Jah Wobble group at Last.FM
 Jah Wobble video interview while in the studio
 Songlines Music Awards 2009

1958 births
Living people
People from Stepney
Public Image Ltd members
English punk rock bass guitarists
Musicians from London
Island Records artists
All Saints Records artists
Alumni of Birkbeck, University of London
Alternative rock bass guitarists
British post-punk musicians
English experimental musicians
Dub musicians
The Damage Manual members